Eriodictyon trichocalyx is a species of flowering plant in the borage family known by the common name hairy yerba santa.

Distribution 
It is native to Southern California and Baja California, where it grows in several habitat types, including chaparral and grassland. It is similar to E. crassifolium and grows in some of the same areas.

Description 
Eriodictyon trichocalyx is a shrub growing erect up to about 2 meters tall, with lance-shaped to oval leaves up to 14 centimeters long. They are hairless and resinous to densely woolly. The inflorescence is a cluster of white to light purple bell-shaped flowers.  At higher elevations, the plant  tends to a much smaller stature and often appear more thin and ratty; rare, large plants at these elevations tend to be old and woody, and may have a large, tree-like trunk at their base and a great deal of dead wood and twigs.

Medicinal Uses
The Cahuilla people of California used it to treat coughs, colds, sore throats, asthma, tuberculosis, and catarrh. It was also used as a liniment and a poultice. The Cahuilla also used it as a tea bath, where it relieved rheumatism, tired limbs, fevers, and sores.

The Chumash also used it as a liniment for the feet and chest.

References

External links 
 Jepson Manual Treatment - Eriodictyon trichocalyx
 Eriodictyon trichocalyx - Photo gallery

trichocalyx
Flora of California
Flora of Baja California
Flora of the California desert regions
Flora of the Sonoran Deserts
Natural history of the California chaparral and woodlands
Natural history of the Colorado Desert
Flora without expected TNC conservation status